Sentinel is an American indie dream rock duo originating from San Francisco, California. Currently Tarabud and Dennis are based out of Seattle, Washington. Their music style is self-described as indie-indie dream pop. The band played regularly in clubs and venues around the San Francisco Bay Area. These include KZSU Stanford Live in Studio, Bottom of the Hill, The Uptown, Blakes on Telegraph, The Red Devil Lounge, 19 Broadway, The Great American Music Hall, Cafe Du Nord, Six Flags Discovery Kingdom Main Stage, The Make-Out Room and Bay Street Emeryville. They were played regularly on San Francisco Bay Area radio stations including KITS Live105, KSAN (FM) The Bone, KALX UC Berkeley, KUSF UC San Francisco, KZSU Stanford and regularly make the list of top Bay Area local bands. Tarabud made top female musician for Bay Area according to Live105 FM Music News in 2011.

Members

 Tarabud, vocals, bass
 Dennis Bestafka, guitar
 Guest Drummer 
 Guest Keyboardist

Musical style and evolution

Influences
The band cites Depeche Mode, Flock of Seagulls, Cocteau Twins, Dead Can Dance, U2, Fleetwood Mac, ABBA, Olivia Newton-John, The Beatles and Ella Fitzgerald as influences.

Discography
 Sentinel (2004) 
 The Singles (2005) 
 Sequels & Hunches E.P. (2007)
 Kites Without Strings (2008)
 For Days Deep (2010)
 Jet Black Single (2010)
 Dark End Single (2011)
 Somewhere Else Single (2012)
 Somewhere Else Extended Dance Remix(2012)
Points of Light (2015)

References 
Footnotes

Points of Light album Review 
Counting Stars Song Review 
Sentinel Discography on Bandcamp
Sentinel Blog Page

External links
Sentinel on Facebook
Sentinel on Twitter
Sentinel Discography on Bandcamp 
Sentinel Discography on CDbaby
Sentinel Blog Page
Sentinel on ReverbNation

American pop music groups
Musical groups from Seattle
Musical groups established in 2004